Leonardo Marquicias (6 January 1931 – 11 September 2002) was a Filipino basketball player who competed in the 1956 Summer Olympics.

References

External links
 

1931 births
2002 deaths
Basketball players from Manila
Olympic basketball players of the Philippines
Basketball players at the 1956 Summer Olympics
Asian Games medalists in basketball
Basketball players at the 1958 Asian Games
Philippines men's national basketball team players
Filipino men's basketball players
Asian Games gold medalists for the Philippines
Medalists at the 1958 Asian Games